The 1992 Brazilian Grand Prix (formally the XXI Grande Prêmio do Brasil) was a Formula One motor race held at Interlagos on 5 April 1992. It was the third race of the 1992 Formula One World Championship.

The 71-lap race was won by Englishman Nigel Mansell, driving a Williams-Renault, after he started from pole position. Mansell's Italian teammate, Riccardo Patrese, finished second after leading the first 31 laps, with German Michael Schumacher third in a Benetton-Ford.

Background
Going into the race, the two major talking points were Williams' utter domination of the previous two races, as well as McLaren's response to that domination: the new MP4/7A would debut at Interlagos, despite having originally been scheduled to debut at Barcelona. However, the car was still experiencing teething issues, despite an intensive testing programme at Silverstone following the Mexican Grand Prix. The team brought a total of 6 complete cars to the race, including three MP4/6Bs to be tested alongside the MP4/7A.

Qualifying

Pre-qualifying report
For the first time in 1992, there was a need for a pre-qualifying hour on Friday morning. The pool consisted of six cars, which needed to be reduced to four to ensure the maximum of 30 cars in the main qualifying sessions. The entrants were the two Lamborghini-powered Venturi LC92 cars entered by the Larrousse team, and driven by Bertrand Gachot and Ukyo Katayama; the Footwork FA13-Mugen-Honda of Michele Alboreto; the Fondmetal GR01 of Andrea Chiesa, and the two Andrea Moda S921s of Roberto Moreno and Perry McCarthy. Moreno and McCarthy had been recruited by Andrea Moda after team boss Andrea Sassetti had fired both his drivers (Alex Caffi and Enrico Bertaggia) after they had criticised the amateurish way the team had been run thus far.

With very little time to prepare, McCarthy had hastily acquired a FISA Super Licence which enabled him to compete in Formula One. However, when he arrived at Interlagos, his licence was rescinded by race director Roland Bruynseraede, who told him there had been an error in the issuing of the licence, so McCarthy was withdrawn from the event. In any case, the team had not finished building his car in time, so he would not have driven in the session anyway.

This left five cars in the session, and it became clear which four were to progress when the remaining Andrea Moda of Roberto Moreno managed just two laps before it broke down, having posted a very slow time. The other four cars were over 15 seconds faster, with Gachot's Venturi topping the time sheets. Alboreto was just under two tenths of a second slower, with Chiesa third in the Fondmetal. Fourth was Katayama, just over a second slower than his team-mate Gachot. Thus Moreno failed to pre-qualify.

Pre-qualifying classification

Qualifying report
The Williams cars were ahead of the McLarens with Mansell on pole ahead of Patrese, with Senna third in front of his home crowd ahead of Berger, Schumacher, and Alesi. There was controversy in the second qualifying session, as Senna slowed in front of an over-enthusiastic Mansell, forcing him wide on the entry to turn 11 and into a spin. Having been collected by the outside wall, Mansell limped out of his damaged Williams. Interestingly, Berger's time was set in one of the MP4/6B's, as he suffered an engine failure in his primary car, an MP4/7A; however, he raced an MP4/7A on raceday.

Qualifying classification

Race

Race report
On the parade lap, Gerhard Berger stalled and had to start at the back. At the start, Mansell was poor and Patrese blasted ahead of him with Brundle getting ahead of Alesi. The order from there was Patrese, Mansell, Senna, Schumacher, Brundle and Alesi. Berger had to retire after only 4 laps in the pits with electrical failure. The Williamses pulled away while Senna was holding the rest at bay; Schumacher was 30 seconds behind by the time he had passed Senna for third on lap 13. Martin Brundle and Jean Alesi passed him soon afterwards and Senna retired with engine problems on lap 17.

The stops brought Alesi closer to Brundle and Alesi made his move on lap 31. The two collided, with Brundle spinning out into retirement as a result. This promoted Karl Wendlinger in the March up to fifth and he was there until his clutch failed on lap 56. As Thierry Boutsen collided with teammate Érik Comas in the leading Ligier and forced the Lotus of Johnny Herbert off into the gravel at the Senna S as it forced both drivers to retire but Comas managed to continue, this incident happened just six laps after Brundle's retirement, Comas would soon retire with gearbox failure on lap 42 which meant a double retirement for Ligier. Meanwhile, Mansell pitted while passing back markers and took advantage of subsequent clear laps, taking over first place when Patrese pitted after slower laps passing more of the back markers. Mansell then built a lead and won with a 29-second lead over Patrese in second, making it yet another Williams 1–2 and lapping the rest of the field ahead of Michael Schumacher, Jean Alesi, Ivan Capelli who was able to score his first points for Ferrari in fifth (which was Ferrari's only double points finish of the season) and Michele Alboreto scoring his first point for Footwork.

Race classification

Championship standings after the race

Drivers' Championship standings

Constructors' Championship standings

References

Brazilian Grand Prix
Brazilian Grand Prix
Grand Prix
Brazilian Grand Prix